The Jabodebek LRT Bekasi Line is one of the two light rail line of the Jabodebek LRT which serves trips from  station to  station. The distance traveled in this fully-elevated line is 29.54 km. The line is currently still under construction.

The Pancoran–Jatimulya section of the line runs along the Jakarta Inner Ring Road, Jakarta–Cikampek Toll Road, and  Jakarta–Cikampek Elevated Toll Road.

Stations

References

Standard gauge railways in Indonesia
Railway lines in Indonesia